Santa Maria di Loreto may refer to:

 Santa Maria di Loreto (Rome), a church in Rome
 Church of Santa María de Loreto, Achao, a church in Chile
 A musical institute in Naples, where Domenico Cimarosa studied